Neoprotoparmelia paulii is a species of saxicolous (rock-dwelling), crustose lichen in the family Parmeliaceae. Found in Kenya, it was formally described as a new species in 2018 by Víctor Jiménez Rico, Helge Thorsten Lumbsch, and Garima Singh. The lichen is only known from the type locality, a montane ecosystem dominated by shrubs and trees from the genera Acacia, Combretum, and Terminalia. Neoprotoparmelia paulii contains several secondary compounds that can be detected using the technique thin-layer chromatography, including atranorin, α–collatolic acid, α–alectoronic acid, and traces of other chemically related substances. The specific epithet paulii honours Kenyan lichenologist Paul Kirika, who collected the type material along with Lumbsch.

References

paulii
Lichen species
Lichens described in 2018
Lichens of Kenya
Taxa named by Helge Thorsten Lumbsch